Doras carinatus is a species of thorny catfish found in Brazil, French Guiana, Guyana, Suriname and Venezuela.  This species grows to a length of  SL.  This species can emit sounds by moving its pectoral spines. Every basic unit of sound emitted lasts for 60–70 milliseconds, with a frequency of 60–90 hertz corresponding to the reply frequency of the muscles utilized.

References

Doradidae
Catfish of South America
Freshwater fish of Brazil
Fish of French Guiana
Fish of Guyana
Fish of Suriname
Fish of Venezuela
Fish described in 1766
Taxa named by Carl Linnaeus